Van Lier is a surname first found in the Netherlands. Spelling variations of this family name include: Leer, Lier, Liere, Lierr, Lierre, Liers, Lieres, Lierrs, Lierres, de Lier, van Lier and many more.

Some of the first settlers in the New World of this family name or some of its variants were: 
Jan Evertsz van Lier, who arrived in New Netherland in 1664;

Notable people with the surname include:

Adeline van Lier (born 1956), Dutch television and radio presenter
Anita van Lier (born 1954), Dutch cricketer
Coenraad van Lier (1836–1903), Suriname physician and politician
Josephine van Lier (born 1968), Dutch cellist
Norm Van Lier (1947–2009), American basketball player and broadcaster

Dutch-language surnames
Surnames of Dutch origin